Danny Johannes Wilhelmus Ebbers (17 July 1974 – 22 July 2015) was a Dutch judoka from Nijmegen. He participated in the 1996 Summer Olympics.

Achievements

References

External links
 
 

1974 births
2015 deaths
Dutch male judoka
Sportspeople from Nijmegen
Judoka at the 1996 Summer Olympics
Olympic judoka of the Netherlands
Deaths from brain cancer in the Netherlands